The 2007–08 Israeli Hockey League season was the 17th season of Israel's hockey league. The Haifa Hawks won their third consecutive Israeli championship.

External links
 List of Israeli champions on hockeyarenas.net

Israeli League
Israeli League (ice hockey) seasons
Seasons